Gulella is a genus of very small air-breathing land snails, terrestrial pulmonate gastropod mollusks in the family Streptaxidae.

Until recently, species which are now in the genus Costigulella were included here.

Distribution 
Distribution of the genus Gulella include:
 Afrotropical: Uganda (20 species)
 Arabia
 Madagascar
 Comoros
 the Seychelles
 Mauritius

Species 
Species within the large genus Gullela include:
 
 Gulella aberdarensis Preston, 1913
 Gulella acutidens (O. Boettger, 1905)
 Gulella adami van Bruggen, 1994
 Gulella aequidentata (E. A. Smith, 1890)
 Gulella afrooccidentalis Verdcourt, 2004
 Gulella albersi (L. Pfeiffer, 1855)
 Gulella albinus van Bruggen & Van Goethem, 1999
 Gulella albogilva Germain, 1934
 Gulella aliciae (Melvill & Ponsonby, 1907)
 Gulella alleni Verdcourt, 1974
 Gulella alutacea Connolly, 1932
 Gulella amaniensis Verdcourt, 1953
 Gulella ambalaniranae Emberton, 2001
 Gulella ambanikelia Emberton, 2001
 Gulella ambodipelomosiae Emberton, 2002
 Gulella ambrensis Emberton, 2001
 Gulella amicta (E. A. Smith, 1890)
 Gulella analamerae Emberton, 2001
 Gulella andreana Fischer-Piette, Blanc, F. & Vukadinovic, 1974
 Gulella andriantanteliae
 Gulella ankaranaensis Fischer-Piette, Blanc, C.P., Blanc, F. & Salvat, 1994
 Gulella annibiodiversitatis van Bruggen, 2011
 Gulella antelmeana Peile, 1936
 Gulella antongilae Emberton, 2001
 Gulella appletoni van Bruggen, 1975
 Gulella aprosdoketa Connolly, 1939
 Gulella aranearum van Bruggen, 1986
 Gulella argoudi Griffiths, 2000
 Gulella arnoldi (Sturany, 1898)
 Gulella arthuri (Dautzenberg, 1890)
 Gulella atewana de Winter, 1996
 Gulella aversostriata Verdcourt, 1985
 Gulella azeitonae D. Holyoak & G. Holyoak, 2020
 Gulella baccata (Preston, 1913)
 Gulella bancoensis de Winter, 1996
 Gulella barbarae Connolly, 1929
 Gulella barnardi van Bruggen, 1965
 Gulella bassetti Burnup, 1925
 Gulella beandreana Emberton, 2001
 Gulella bebokae Emberton, 2001
 Gulella bemarahae Emberton, 2001
 Gulella bemoka Emberton, 2001
 Gulella benetecta Connolly, 1930
 Gulella benjamini Emberton & Pearce, 2000
 Gulella bernardi van Bruggen & Van Goethem, 1997
 Gulella betamponae Emberton, 2002
 Gulella bicolor (T. Hutton, 1834)
 Gulella bitzeense Connolly, 1922
 Gulella bobaombiae Emberton, 2001
 Gulella bolocoensis Ortiz de Zárate López & Ortiz de Zárate Rocandio, 1956
 Gulella bomolensis Verdcourt, 1953
 Gulella bomvana Cole & Herbert, 2009
 Gulella bondi Verdcourt, 1962
 Gulella bouchardi Fischer-Piette, Blanc, F. & Vukadinovic, 1974
 Gulella boucheti Fischer-Piette, Blanc, C.P., Blanc, F. & Salvat, 1994
 Gulella bowkerae (Melvill & Ponsonby, 1892)
 Gulella brevicula (Morelet, 1882)
 Gulella brevis (Thiele, 1911)
 Gulella bruggeni Cole & Herbert, 2009
 Gulella burnupi (Melvill & Ponsonby, 1897)
 Gulella burungaensis (Preston, 1913)
 Gulella bushmanensis Burnup, 1926
 Gulella cacosystata Germain, 1934
 Gulella cacuminata Ortiz de Zárate López & Ortiz de Zárate Rocandio, 1956
 Gulella cairnsi (Melvill & Ponsonby, 1897)
 Gulella callosa (Morelet, 1881)
 Gulella calopasa (Melvill & Ponsonby, 1903)
 Gulella camerani (Pollonera, 1906)
 Gulella cancellata Connolly, 1922
 Gulella candela Connolly, 1922
 Gulella candidula (Morelet, 1889)
 Gulella capmini Emberton, 2001
 Gulella cara Pilsbry, 1919 
 Gulella carea (Preston, 1913)
 Gulella caroli (Kobelt, 1913)
 Gulella carpenteri Connolly, 1931
 Gulella caryatis (Melvill & Ponsonby, 1898)
 Gulella cavidens (E. von Martens, 1876)
 Gulella ceciliae van Bruggen, 1971
 Gulella celestinae Emberton, 2001
 Gulella cerea (Dunker, 1848)
 Gulella chapini Pilsbry, 1919
 Gulella cheranganiensis Germain, 1934
 Gulella chi Burnup, 1926
 Gulella claustralis Connolly, 1939
 Gulella claustrum (Preston, 1913)
 Gulella coarctata (D'Ailly, 1910)
 Gulella coarti (Dautzenberg & Germain, 1914)
 Gulella coeni (Preston, 1913)
 Gulella collicola van Bruggen, 1966
 Gulella columella (E. A. Smith, 1903)
 Gulella columna Emberton, 2001
 Gulella columnella (Melvill & Ponsonby, 1901)
 Gulella commoda (E. A. Smith, 1903)
 Gulella comorensis (E. von Martens, 1876)
 Gulella conicodentata K. L. Pfeiffer, 1952
 Gulella connollyi (Melvill & Ponsonby, 1909)
 Gulella conradti (E. von Martens, 1895)
 Gulella consanguinea (E. A. Smith, 1890)
 Gulella consobrina (Ancey, 1892)
 Gulella consociata (E. A. Smith, 1890)
 Gulella constricta Emberton, 2001
 Gulella contingens Burnup, 1925
 Gulella contraria Connolly, 1932
 Gulella copiosa (Preston, 1913)
 Gulella corneola (Morelet, 1886)
 Gulella costellata (Morelet, 1882)
 Gulella crassidens (L. Pfeiffer, 1859)
 Gulella crassilabris (Craven, 1881)
 Gulella craterodon (Melvill & Ponsonby, 1903)
 Gulella cruciata (E. von Martens, 1900)
 Gulella crux van Bruggen, 2011
 Gulella crystallum (Morelet, 1848)
 Gulella cupula van Bruggen & Van Goethem, 1999
 Gulella curvicolumella (Preston, 1913)
 Gulella curvilamella (E. A. Smith, 1890)
 Gulella cyclochilus Degner, 1934
 Gulella cylindrica (L. Pfeiffer, 1852)
 Gulella daedalea (Melvill & Ponsonby, 1903)
 Gulella darglensis (Melvill & Ponsonby, 1908)
 Gulella dartevillei Verdcourt, 1962
 Gulella dautzenbergi Connolly, 1928
 Gulella davisae Herbert, 2016
 Gulella decaryi Fischer-Piette & Vukadinovic, 1974
 Gulella decussatula (Preston, 1913)
 Gulella dejae Bursey & Herbert, 2004
 Gulella delicatula (L. Pfeiffer, 1857)
 Gulella dentiens (Morelet, 1883)
 Gulella devia Connolly, 1931
 Gulella deviae Herbert, 2006
 Gulella dextrorsa Burnup, 1925
 Gulella diabensis Connolly, 1939
 Gulella diodon (Morelet, 1882)
 Gulella discrepans (Sturany, 1898)
 Gulella disseminata (Preston, 1913)
 Gulella distincta (Melvill & Ponsonby, 1893)
 Gulella dohrni (E. A. Smith, 1882)
 Gulella dolichos Verdcourt, 1985
 Gulella doliolum (Morelet, 1867)
 Gulella dorri (Dautzenberg, 1890)
 Gulella drakensbergensis (Melvill & Ponsonby, 1893)
 Gulella duncani Connolly, 1930
 Gulella dunkeri (L. Pfeiffer, 1856)
 Gulella dupuisi Connolly, 1922
 Gulella dupuyana (Crosse, 1876)
 Gulella ectodentata van Bruggen & Van Goethem, 1999
 Gulella elliptica (Melvill & Ponsonby, 1898)
 Gulella enneodon Connolly, 1922
 Gulella eoryi Verdcourt, 2004
 Gulella erugo Rowson, Foster, Seddon & Tattersfield, 2019
 Gulella escalarai Ortiz de Zárate López & Ortiz de Zárate Rocandio, 1956
 Gulella eussoensis (Preston, 1913)
 Gulella euthymia (Melvill & Ponsonby, 1893)
 Gulella excavata (E. von Martens, 1892)
 Gulella excruciata Connolly, 1931
 Gulella exogonia (E. von Martens, 1895)
 Gulella expatriata (Preston, 1910)
 Gulella falconi Burnup, 1925
 Gulella farquhari (Melvill & Ponsonby, 1895)
 Gulella fernandensis Ortiz de Zárate López & Ortiz de Zárate Rocandio, 1956
 Gulella filix Connolly, 1922
 Gulella fischerpiettei Emberton, 2001
 Gulella formosa (Melvill & Ponsonby, 1898)
 Gulella fortidentata (E.A. Smith, 1890)
 Gulella fotobohitrae Emberton, 2001
 Gulella foveolata Preston, 1913
 Gulella framesi Burnup, 1926
 Gulella fraudator Connolly, 1939
 Gulella funerea (Preston, 1913)
 Gulella galactochila (Crosse, 1885)
 Gulella gallorum Fischer-Piette, Blanc, F. & Salvat, 1975
 Gulella garambae van Bruggen & Van Goethem, 1999
 Gulella genialis (Melvill & Ponsonby, 1903)
 Gulella gestroi (Germain, 1915)
 Gulella girardi (Kobelt, 1904)
 Gulella glabra (Morelet, 1882)
 Gulella godfreyi Burnup, 1925
 Gulella gouldi (L. Pfeiffer, 1856)
 Gulella greenwayi Verdcourt, 1953
 Gulella griffithsi Emberton, 2001
 Gulella guilielmi van Bruggen & Van Goethem, 1998
 Gulella gwendolinae (Preston, 1910)
 Gulella hadroglossa Herbert, 2016
 Gulella hafa Emberton, 2001
 Gulella hafahafa Emberton, 2001
 Gulella hamerae Bursey & Herbert, 2004
 Gulella handeiensis Verdcourt, 1953
 Gulella harriesi Burnup, 1926
 Gulella haullevillei (Dautzenberg & Germain, 1914)
 Gulella hector (Preston, 1913)
 Gulella helichrysophila Germain, 1934
 Gulella hemmingi Verdcourt, 1963
 Gulella herberti van Bruggen, 2004
 Gulella heteromphala Pilsbry, 1919
 Gulella hildae van Bruggen, 2001
 Gulella himerothales (Melvill & Ponsonby, 1903)
 Gulella hoqensis Neubert, 2004
 Gulella hordeum (Morelet, 1879)
 Gulella hughscotti Verdcourt, 1980
 Gulella humbloti (Morelet, 1886)
 Gulella impedita Connolly, 1922
 Gulella inconspicua  (Thiele, 1911)
 Gulella incurvidens van Bruggen, 1972
 Gulella infans (Craven, 1881)
 Gulella infrendens (E. von Martens, 1866)
 Gulella ingloria (Preston, 1913)
 Gulella inhluzaniensis (Burnup, 1914)
 Gulella inobstructa van Bruggen, 1965
 Gulella insolita (E. A. Smith, 1903)
 Gulella instabilis (Sturany, 1898)
 Gulella insularis (Girard, 1894)
 Gulella insulincola van Bruggen, 1975
 Gulella intradentata (Preston, 1913)
 Gulella intrusa Verdcourt, 1956
 Gulella io Verdcourt, 1974
 Gulella iridescens (Preston, 1913)
 Gulella isipingoensis (Sturany, 1898)
 Gulella isseli (Paladilhe, 1872)
 Gulella jaominai Emberton, 2001
 Gulella jod (Preston, 1910)
 Gulella johannae van Bruggen, 2006
 Gulella johannesburgensis (Melvill & Ponsonby, 1907)
 Gulella jongkindi de Winter, 1996
 Gulella josephinae Emberton, 2001
 Gulella juxtidens (Melvill & Ponsonby, 1899)
 Gulella kelibea Emberton, 2001
 Gulella kelimolotra Emberton, 2002
 Gulella kendrae Emberton & Griffiths, 2009
 Gulella kidundae Adam, 1965
 Gulella kigeziensis (Preston, 1913)
 Gulella kohllarseni (Haas, 1936)
 Gulella kosiensis (Melvill & Ponsonby, 1908)
 Gulella kraussi (L. Pfeiffer, 1856)
 Gulella kulalensis Verdcourt, 1962
 Gulella labiotuberculata Connolly, 1942
 Gulella lacuna (Preston, 1911)
 Gulella laevigata (Dohrn, 1865)
 Gulella laevorsa Burnup, 1925
 Gulella lambda Degner, 1934
 Gulella lamyi (Dautzenberg & Germain, 1914)
 Gulella landianiensis (Dautzenberg, 1908)
 Gulella langei Rowson, Foster, Seddon & Tattersfield, 2019
 Gulella laninifia Emberton, 2002
 Gulella laqueus (Preston, 1913)
 Gulella larva (Morelet, 1877)
 Gulella latimerae Bursey & Herbert, 2004
 Gulella lawrencei van Bruggen, 1964
 † Gulella leakeyi Verdcourt, 1963 
 Gulella lendix (E. A. Smith, 1890)
 Gulella lessensis Pilsbry, 1919
 Gulella leucocion Connolly, 1929
 Gulella lievrouwi van Bruggen & Van Goethem, 1999
 Gulella lima (Preston, 1913)
 Gulella lincolni Emberton & Griffiths, 2009
 Gulella lindae Herbert, 2006
 Gulella linguidens Connolly, 1939
 Gulella lissophanes (Melvill & Ponsonby, 1892)
 Gulella lohabea Emberton, 2001
 Gulella lornae Verdcourt, 1952
 Gulella loveridgei van Bruggen, 1996
 Gulella lubeti Fischer-Piette, Blanc, C.P., Blanc, F. & Salvat, 1994
 Gulella lubrica (Morelet, 1881)
 Gulella ludwigi Verdcourt & Venmans, 1953
 Gulella magnifica Emberton, 2001
 Gulella magnolia (Connolly, 1912)
 Gulella magnorchida Emberton, 2001
 Gulella mahafinaratra Emberton, 2001
 Gulella mahagaga Emberton, 2001
 Gulella mahia Emberton, 2001
 Gulella malasangiensis (Preston, 1913)
 Gulella mamellensis Griffiths, 2000
 Gulella manomboae Emberton, 2001
 Gulella mariae (Melvill & Ponsonby, 1892)
 Gulella marionae (Preston, 1910)
 Gulella maritzburgensis (Melvill & Ponsonby, 1893)
 Gulella marojejyae Emberton, 2001
 Gulella masoalae Emberton, 2001
 Gulella masis iensis Pilsbry, 1919
 Gulella matavymolotra Emberton, 2002
 Gulella matumbiensis Verdcourt, 1993
 Gulella mayottensis Connolly, 1925
 † Gulella mbili Pickford, 2009 
 Gulella megapex Neubert, 2004
 Gulella melvilli (Burnup, 1914)
 Gulella meneleki (Preston, 1910)
 Gulella menkeana (L. Pfeiffer, 1853)
 Gulella menkhorsti van Bruggen, 2011
 Gulella meruensis (D'Ailly, 1910)
 Gulella mfongosiensis Burnup, 1925
 Gulella miaranoniae Emberton, 2001
 Gulella miaryi Fischer-Piette & Bedoucha, 1964
 Gulella micans K. L. Pfeiffer, 1952
 Gulella michellae Emberton, 2001
 Gulella microdina (Morelet, 1883)
 Gulella microdon (Morelet, 1860)
 Gulella microrutshuruensis van Bruggen, 1995
 Gulella microstriata Emberton, 2001
 Gulella mihomehia Emberton, 2001
 Gulella mikenoensis (Preston, 1913)
 Gulella miniata (F. Krauss, 1848)
 Gulella minuscula Emberton & Pearce, 2000
 Gulella minuta (Morelet, 1889)
 Gulella minutissima (Thiele, 1911)
 Gulella mitsikia Emberton, 2001
 Gulella mkuu Rowson, Seddon & Tattersfield, 2009
 Gulella modioliformis (Morelet, 1877)
 † Gulella moja Pickford, 2009 
 Gulella mongolae Ortiz de Zárate Lopez & Ortiz de Zárate Rocandio, 1956
 Gulella monodon (Morelet, 1873)
 Gulella montium (D'Ailly, 1910)
 Gulella mooiensis (Burnup, 1914)
 Gulella msoalae Emberton, 2001
 Gulella multidentata (Sturany, 1898)
 Gulella munita (Melvill & Ponsonby, 1892)
 Gulella nakamaroa Emberton, 2001
 Gulella namorokae Emberton, 2001
 Gulella natalensis (Craven, 1881)
 Gulella ndibo Cole & Herbert, 2009
 Gulella nemoralis (Germain, 1915)
 Gulella nepia Connolly, 1925
 Gulella newmani Bursey & Herbert, 2004
 Gulella newtoni (E. A. Smith, 1890)
 Gulella ngorogoroensis Verdcourt, 1985
 Gulella nifikelia Emberton, 2001
 † Gulella nne Pickford, 2009 
 Gulella noltei (Boettger, 1898)
 Gulella nosybei Emberton, 2001
 Gulella nuchalis van Bruggen, 2011
 Gulella nyikaensis (Preston, 1913)
 Gulella nyiroensis (Preston, 1913)
 Gulella obani Oke, 2007 
 Gulella obovata (L. Pfeiffer, 1855)
 Gulella obstructa van Bruggen, 1965
 Gulella odhneriana Dupuis, 1923
 Gulella odietei Oke, 2013
 Gulella ogbeifuni Oke, 2013
 Gulella olkokolae W. Adam, 1965
 Gulella opoboensis (Preston, 1914)
 Gulella orchida Emberton, 2001
 Gulella orientalis Connolly, 1929
 Gulella oryza (Morelet, 1882)
 Gulella ovalis (Thiele, 1911)
 Gulella ovularis (Morelet, 1886)
 Gulella pangumana Connolly, 1928
 Gulella papyracea (Preston, 1913)
 Gulella paucidens Verdcourt, 1953
 Gulella pearcei Emberton, 2001
 Gulella peculiaris (E. A. Smith, 1890)
 Gulella penningtoni Burnup, 1925
 Gulella pentheri (Sturany, 1898)
 Gulella pentodon (Morelet, 1889)
 Gulella percivali (Preston, 1913)
 Gulella pergrata (Preston, 1913)
 Gulella perissodonta (Sturany, 1898)
 Gulella perlata Connolly, 1922
 Gulella perplexa Connolly, 1939
 Gulella perspicua (Melvill & Ponsonby, 1893)
 Gulella perspicuaeformis (Sturany, 1898)
 Gulella pervitrea (Preston, 1913)
 Gulella petitboucheti Emberton, 2001
 Gulella pfeifferi (Krauss in Kuster, 1844)
 Gulella phanerodon (Morelet, 1888)
 Gulella phragma (Melvill & Ponsonby, 1907)
 Gulella phyllisae Burnup, 1925
 Gulella planidens (E. von Martens, 1892)
 Gulella planti  (L. Pfeiffer, 1856) - Plant's gulella snail
 Gulella platycostata Neubert, 2004
 Gulella plicigera (Morelet, 1886)
 Gulella polita (Melvill & Ponsonby, 1893)
 Gulella polloneriana Pilsbry, 1919
 Gulella pondoensis Connolly, 1939
 Gulella ponsonbyi (Burnup, 1914)
 Gulella porcina Connolly, 1930
 Gulella poutrini (Germain, 1918)
 Gulella praelonga Connolly, 1922
 Gulella premnodes (Sturany, 1902)
 Gulella prestoni Connolly, 1922
 Gulella pretoriana Connolly, 1932
 Gulella princei (Preston, 1911)
 Gulella protruda Neubert & Frank, 1996
 Gulella proxima van Bruggen, 2014
 Gulella pseudandreana Emberton, 2001
 Gulella pseudolkokolae Verdcourt, 2004
 Gulella puella Connolly, 1929
 Gulella pulchella (Melvill & Ponsonby, 1893)
 Gulella pusilla (Morelet, 1881)
 Gulella puzeyi Connolly, 1939
 Gulella queketti (Melvill & Ponsonby, 1896)
 Gulella raffrayi (Bourguignat, 1883)
 Gulella rakotoarisoni Emberton, 2001
 Gulella ranomasina Emberton, 2001
 Gulella razafyi Emberton, 2001
 Gulella rectangularis (Preston, 1913)
 Gulella reeae Emberton & Pearce, 2000
 Gulella reesi (Preston, 1914)
 Gulella reniformis (Preston, 1913)
 Gulella rewgidensis Neubert, 2004
 Gulella rhodesiana (Connolly, 1912)
 Gulella roberti (Preston, 1910)
 Gulella rogersi (Melvill & Ponsonby, 1898)
 Gulella rubinsterni Fischer-Piette, Blanc, C.P., Blanc, F. & Salvat, 1994
 Gulella rugosa Emberton, 2001
 Gulella rumpiana Connolly, 1932
 Gulella runa Rowson, Foster, Seddon & Tattersfield, 2019
 Gulella ruthae Emberton, 2002
 Gulella rutshuruensis Pilsbry, 1919
 Gulella ruwenzoriensis van Bruggen & van Goethem, 1999
 Gulella sahia Emberton, 2002
 Gulella salpinx Herbert, 2002
 Gulella sandersoni Connolly, 1942
 Gulella sankuruensis Dartevelle-Puissant, 1936
 Gulella satisfacta Fischer-Piette, Blanc, C.P., Blanc, F. & Salvat, 1994
 Gulella schweinfurthi (Thiele, 1910)
 Gulella sellae (Pollonera, 1906)
 Gulella seneciophila Germain, 1934
 Gulella separata (Sturany, 1898)
 Gulella sesamum (Morelet, 1883)
 Gulella sexdentata (E. von Martens, 1869)
 Gulella shabae Adam & Van Goethem, 1978
 Gulella shoaensis Verdcourt, 1985
 Gulella sibasana Connolly, 1922
 Gulella simplicima (Preston, 1911)
 † Gulella sita Pickford, 2009 
 Gulella socialis Pilsbry, 1919
 Gulella socotrensis Neubert, 2004
 Gulella soror (E. A. Smith, 1890)
 Gulella soulaiana Fischer-Piette, 1973
 Gulella spreta (Morelet, 1883)
 Gulella stolidodea Degner, 1934
 Gulella streptostelopsis Bruggen, 2007
 Gulella strictilabris (Ancey, 1898)
 Gulella stylodon (E. von Martens, 1876)
 Gulella suavissima (Preston, 1913)
 Gulella subflavescens (E. A. Smith, 1890)
 Gulella subframesi Connolly, 1929
 Gulella subhyalina (E. A. Smith, 1890)
 Gulella subkraussi Connolly, 1932
 Gulella subringens (Crosse, 1886)
 Gulella subsellae Haas, 1936
 Gulella sursum van Bruggen, 2001
 Gulella swaziensis Connolly, 1932
 Gulella sylvia (Melvill & Ponsonby, 1903)
 Gulella syngenes (Preston, 1913)
 Gulella systemanaturae van Bruggen, 2008
 Gulella taitensis Verdcourt, 1963
 † Gulella tano Pickford, 2009 
 Gulella taolantehezana Emberton, 2002
 † Gulella tatu Pickford, 2009 
 Gulella tendronia Emberton, 2001
 Gulella tharfieldensis (Melvill & Ponsonby, 1893)
 Gulella thompsoni K. C. Emberton, Slapcinsky, Campbell, Rakotondrazafy, Andriamiarison & J. D. Emberton, 2010 
 Gulella tietzae Cole & Herbert, 2009
 Gulella titania Connolly, 1928
 Gulella tomlini (Preston, 1911)
 Gulella tracheia Rowson, 2007
 Gulella translucida K. L. Pfeiffer, 1952
 Gulella transnominata Connolly, 1925
 Gulella triglochis (Melvill & Ponsonby, 1903)
 Gulella trigona (Morelet, 1881)
 Gulella triplicina (E. von Martens, 1895)
 Gulella tripodium Connolly, 1939
 Gulella tristaoensis Connolly, 1922
 Gulella tsara Emberton, 2001
 Gulella tsaratananae Emberton, 2001
 Gulella tudes (E. von Martens, 1895)
 Gulella udzungwensis van Bruggen, 2003
 Gulella ugandensis (E. A. Smith, 1901)
 Gulella uluguruensis Verdcourt, 1962
 Gulella umzimvubuensis Burnup, 1925
 Gulella unidentata K. L. Pfeiffer, 1952
 Gulella vakinifia Emberton, 2001
 Gulella vallaris (Melvill & Ponsonby, 1907)
 Gulella varians (E. A. Smith, 1899)
 Gulella vatosoa Emberton, 2001
 Gulella vavakelia Emberton, 2001
 Gulella ventricosa Neubert, 2004
 Gulella verdcourti van Bruggen, 1966
 Gulella vermis (Morelet, 1881)
 Gulella viae Burnup, 1925
 Gulella viatoris (Preston, 1913)
 Gulella vicina (E.A. Smith, 1899)
 Gulella virungae van Bruggen & van Goethem, 1999
 Gulella vohimarae Emberton, 2001
 Gulella vriesiana (C. M. F. Ancey, 1885)
 Gulella wahlbergi (F. Krauss, 1848)
 Gulella warrenii (Melvill & Ponsonby, 1903)
 Gulella wendalinae van Bruggen, 1975
 Gulella wilmattae (Pilsbry & Cockerell, 1933)
 Gulella woodhousei (Preston, 1913)
 Gulella xysila (Melvill & Ponsonby, 1907)
 Gulella zanaharyi Emberton, 2001
 Gulella zelota (Melvill & Ponsonby, 1907)
 Gulella zemenensis Verdcourt, 1990
 Gulella zuluensis Connolly, 1932
 Gulella sp. 1 sensu Emberton & Griffiths (2009)
 Gulella sp. 2 sensu Emberton & Griffiths (2009)
 Gulella sp. 3 sensu Emberton & Griffiths (2009)

synonyms:
 Gulella amboniensis : synonym of Juventigulella amboniensis (Tattersfield, 1998) (original combination)
 Gulella avakubiensis Pilsbry, 1919: synonym of Avakubia avakubiensis (Pilsbry, 1919) (superseded combination)
 Gulella caryatis diabensis Connolly, 1939: synonym of Gulella diabensis Connolly, 1939 (original combination)
 Gulella conospira (Martens, 1892): synonym of Conogulella conospira (E. von Martens, 1892) (superseded combination)
 Gulella cuspidata Verdcourt, 1962: synonym of Dadagulella cuspidata (Verdcourt, 1962) (original combination)
 Gulella foliifera (E. von Martens, 1895): synonym of Primigulella foliifera (E. von Martens, 1895) (superseded combination)
 Gulella grossa (E. von Martens, 1892): synonym of Primigulella grossa (E. von Martens, 1892) (superseded combination)
 Gulella kuiperi de Winter, 2007: synonym of Silvigulella kuiperi (De Winter, 2006) (basionym)
 Gulella linguifera (Martens, 1895): synonym of Primigulella linguifera (E. von Martens, 1895) (superseded combination)
 Gulella ndamanyiluensis]] Venmans, 1956: synonym of Primigulella ndamanyiluensis (Venmans, 1956) (original combination)
 Gulella osborni Pilsbry, 1919: synonym of Silvigulella osborni (Pilsbry, 1919) (original combination)
 Gulella pupa (Thiele, 1911): synonym of Pupigulella pupa (Thiele, 1911) (superseded combination)
 Gulella selene van Bruggen & van Goethem, 1999: synonym of Dadagulella selene (van Bruggen & Van Goethem, 1999) (original combination)
 Gulella thomasseti is a synonym for Glabrennea thomasseti (Sykes, 1909)
 Gulella usambarica K. L. Pfeiffer, 1952: synonym of Gulella ludwigi Verdcourt & Venmans, 1953 (junior secondary homonym of Gulella usambarica (Craven, 1880); Gulella ludwigi Verdcourt & Venmans, 1953 is a replacement name)
 Gulella usambarica (Craven, 1880): synonym of Primigulella usambarica (Craven, 1880) (superseded combination)

References 

 Bank, R. A. (2017). Classification of the Recent terrestrial Gastropoda of the World. Last update: July 16th, 2017

Further reading 
 Connolly, M. (1922). Notes on African non-marine Mollusca, with descriptions of many new species. The Annals and Magazine of Natural History, (9) 10 (59): 485-517, pl. 14. London.
 Burnup H. C. (1925). "On some South African Gulellae, with descriptions of new species and varieties. Part 1." Annals of the Natal Museum 5: 101-158; pls. 8-9.
 Pilsbry, H.A. & Cockerell, T.D.A. (1933). African Mollusca, chiefly from the Belgian Congo. Proceedings of the Zoological Society of London 1933: 365–375.
 Verdcourt B. (1985). "New taxa of Gulella L. Pfr. and Ptychotrema Mörch (Mollusca, Streptaxidae) from Eastern Africa". Journal of Conchology 32(1): 109-122. abstract.
 Rowson B. & Herbert D.G. (2016). The type species and circumscription of the species-rich Afrotropical snail genus Gulella L. Pfeiffer, 1856, based on anatomical and mtDNA data (Mollusca: Eupulmonata: Streptaxidae). Archiv für Molluskenkunde. 145(1): 69-84. page(s): 76

External links 
 
 Pfeiffer, L. (1856). Versuch einer Anordnung derr Heliceen nach natürlichen Gruppen. Malakozoologische Blätter. 2: 112-185.
 Pilsbry, H.A. (1919). A review of the land mollusks of the Belgian Congo chiefly based on the collections of the American Museum Congo Expedition, 1909-1915. Bulletin of the American Museum of Natural History, 40: 1-370, pls I-XXIII

 
Streptaxidae
Taxonomy articles created by Polbot
Taxa named by Ludwig Karl Georg Pfeiffer